The 2016–17 Kuwait Emir Cup will be the 55th edition and will consist of 2 groups top 2 of each group advanced to the finals.

Kuwait SC are the defending champions.

Group-Stage

Group A

Group B

Knockouts

Bracket

Semi-finals

Final

References

External links

Kuwait Emir Cup seasons
Kuwait Emir Cup
Emir Cup